is a city located in Yamanashi Prefecture, Japan. ,  the city had an estimated population of 30,311 in 13079 households, and a population density of 190 persons per km2.

Geography
Tsuru is located in southeastern Yamanashi Prefecture, in the foothills of Mount Fuji. It is bordered on the south by the Tanzawa Mountains. The Sagami River, known locally as the Katsura River,  flows through the city.

Neighboring municipalities
Yamanashi Prefecture
Fujiyoshida
Ōtsuki
Uenohara
Minamitsuru District - Yamanakako, Oshino, Nishikatsura, Fujikawaguchiko

Climate
The city has a climate characterized by characterized by hot and humid summers, and relatively mild winters (Köppen climate classification Cfb).  The average annual temperature in Tsuru is 12.3 °C. The average annual rainfall is 1610 mm with September as the wettest month. The temperatures are highest on average in August, at around 24.2 °C, and lowest in January, at around 0.9 °C.

Demographics
Per Japanese census data, the population of Tsuru peaked around the year 2000 and has declined since.

History
The area around Tsuru has been continuously inhabited since the Japanese Paleolithic period, and numerous artifacts from the Jōmon period and Kofun period have been found within its borders. The area has been part of ancient Tsuru County of Kai Province since the Nara period. During the Sengoku period, the area was controlled by the Takeda clan. During the Edo period, all of Kai Province was tenryō territory under direct control of the Tokugawa shogunate. During the cadastral reform of the early Meiji period on April 1, 1889, the village of Tani was created within Minamitsuru District, Yamanashi Prefecture. Tani was raised to town status on March 7, 1896. On April 29, 1954 Tani merged with four neighboring villages to form the city of Tsuru.

Government
Tsuru has a mayor-council form of government with a directly elected mayor and a unicameral city legislature of 16 members.

Education
Tsuru University
Tsuru has eight public elementary schools and three public middle schools operated by the city government and three public high schools operated by the Yamanashi Prefectural Board of Education. The prefecture also operates the public Yamanashi Industrial Technology Junior College.

Transportation

Railway
 Fuji Kyuko - Ōtsuki Line 
  -  -  -  -  -  -  -

Highway
  Chūō Expressway

Sister cities
  - Hendersonville, Tennessee, USA

Notable people from Tsuru
Kazuo Dan, novelist
Jinpachi Nezu, actor
Yasuyo Yamasaki, Colonel in command of IJA forces at Battle of Attu
Mika Yamamoto, video and photo journalist

References

External links

Official Website 

 
Cities in Yamanashi Prefecture